In Australia, a family trust refers to a type of discretionary trust, set up to manage the assets of a family or its business. Family trusts are vehicles for the protection of family assets or the employ of a tax minimisation strategy. Commonly used to arrange family affairs, family trusts place an obligation on a trusteed to hold and manage assets on behalf of beneficiaries. This method of financial structuring removes assets from ownership of an individual. This in turn can impact tax liability, as income derived from the trust can then be distributed to its beneficiaries by the trustee.

Discretionary trusts are the most common trust method used in Australia, where the trustee is given complete direction as to how trust income is distributed to beneficiaries. Family trusts are the typical discretionary trust, used to hold the personal or business assets of a family. A family business can be operated through a discretionary family trust, with the beneficiaries of that trust being paid a share of the profits made. This allows for the income made to be divided between family members, who then may each pay a lower rate of taxation than otherwise would be due. 

Family trusts in Australia are primarily used by the wealthy, with 0.4 percent of taxpayers accounting for 95 percent of the income distributed from such trusts. The Australian Taxation Office estimates an approximate total of 800,000 trusts in Australia, with assets totalling more than $3 trillion. Family trusts pay no tax, with the funds directed into the trust then distributed to individual beneficiaries who then pay tax at the appropriate rate.

The Australia Institute has expressed concern about the "staggering" amount of tax avoided through the use of such trusts, observing Australians with taxable incomes of $500,000 or more contribute most to the total of assets currently managed by trusts.

Further reading 
 Nick Renton (2014) 'Family Trusts' Wrightbooks

References 

Law